Swan Lake is a song by The Cats. It is a cover of Swan Lake by Pyotr Ilyich Tchaikovsky and made #48 on the UK Singles Chart in early 1969, making them the first British reggae band to have a top fifty hit in the UK.

In popular culture
The British ska band Madness did a cover version of "Swan Lake" on their 1979 debut album One Step Beyond....
In spite of a remark he made earlier on in his career saying "reggae is vile", the song appears on Morrissey's compilation album Under the Influence.

References

1968 singles
1968 songs
British reggae songs
Ska songs